The 1993 European Junior Badminton Championships was the 13th tournament of the European Junior Badminton Championships. It was held in Sofia, Bulgaria, in the month of April. Danish players swept all the titles home, the singles, the doubles and mixed team championships as well.

Medalists

Results

Semi-finals

Finals

Medal table

References 

European Junior Badminton Championships
European Junior Badminton Championships
European Junior Badminton Championships
European Junior Badminton Championships
International sports competitions hosted by Bulgaria